"Moroccan Christmas" is the eleventh episode of the fifth season of the television series The Office, and the show's eighty-third episode overall. The episode aired in the United States on December 11, 2008, on NBC.

It is the third Christmas-themed episode of The Office and the first in two years, as 2007's planned edition was abandoned due to the 2007–2008 Writers Guild of America strike.

In this episode, Phyllis throws a Moroccan-themed Christmas party as head of the Party Planning Committee, infuriating former head Angela. The party takes a dark turn when Meredith gets drunk and accidentally sets her hair on fire. Meanwhile, Dwight  makes money by taking advantage of the latest toy craze, a Princess Unicorn doll.

Plot
Phyllis Vance (Phyllis Smith) throws a Moroccan-themed Christmas party, her first Christmas party as head of the Party Planning Committee. Alcohol is served at the party, of which Meredith Palmer (Kate Flannery) takes full advantage—she gets so intoxicated that she accidentally sets her hair on fire while she is dancing. Dwight Schrute (Rainn Wilson) puts out the fire with an extinguisher and the party comes to a halt. Michael Scott (Steve Carell) then stages an intervention by gathering everyone in a circle to discuss how Meredith's alcoholism affects them. When Meredith continues to deny her alcoholism, the rest of the office find it best to go back to the party. Michael then talks with Meredith in his office before leaving the building. Meredith is told by Michael that they are going to a bar, but he actually takes her to a rehabilitation center. When Meredith sees this, she tries to escape, but Michael grabs her and drags her in. However, Michael learns that the staff will not check anyone in against their will, so he and Meredith leave and drive back to the office.

Dwight has been performing research to determine what will be the most popular toy of the current Christmas season: a doll named "Princess Unicorn". Dwight has bought every doll he could find in the local toy stores and explains he is going to sell the dolls to desperate parents for an enormous profit, retaliating to the fact that those parents waited until the last minute to buy their kids presents. Jim Halpert (John Krasinski) is skeptical that people would pay a high price for a doll, but he watches numerous customers come in throughout the day to purchase a doll from Dwight, all paying his asking price of $200. Toby Flenderson (Paul Lieberstein) wants to buy a doll for his daughter, Sasha, so he can be the hero this Christmas, which would irritate his ex-wife. When he goes to Dwight to purchase one, he finds that Darryl Philbin (Craig Robinson) has already purchased the last one. Toby begs Darryl to the verge of tears, and Darryl offers to sell it to him for twice the price. Toby tells him that he does not have the money with him, but Darryl allows him to pay him back later, and Toby becomes visibly happy. He is, however, slightly taken aback when the doll he gets from Darryl is a black version of the doll, but he decides not to complain.

Throughout the day, Phyllis continues to order Angela Martin (Angela Kinsey) to do various tasks for the party, such as preparing a plate of bread and hummus, or putting away her Nativity scene and removing the Christmas tree (as neither of those are in the theme of Moroccan Christmas). When Phyllis tells Angela to bring back the Christmas tree after Michael and Meredith leave, Angela refuses. She points out that Angela's affair with Dwight is the one hold Phyllis has on her, and she is confident that Phyllis would not give that up over something so minor. On top of that, Angela states that revealing the secret would mean Phyllis would not be able to be the head of the committee anymore. However, Phyllis immediately announces Angela and Dwight's affair to the office. Everyone is shocked by the revelation, except for Dwight, who seems proud of himself. Andy Bernard (Ed Helms), however, is absent for Phyllis' announcement, having been in the annex teaching himself to play a sitar. At the end of the episode, he returns to the party to play "Deck the Halls" for Angela on the sitar, before she asks him to take her home. The rest of the office is still speechless at Phyllis' announcement and neglect to reveal Angela's secret to Andy.

Production
"Moroccan Christmas" was written by Justin Spitzer and directed by Paul Feig. Kate Flannery said shooting this episode was "maybe the most fun I have ever had working in front of a camera". Although Flannery has done her own stunts in previous episodes, including when she was struck by a car in the fourth season premiere "Fun Run", a stuntwoman was used for the scenes in which her hair catches fire in "Moroccan Christmas".

Cultural references
Shortly after Meredith's hair catches fire, Kevin calls her "fire girl". This is a reference to the second season episode "The Fire", in which then-temp Ryan Howard accidentally sets a fire in the office, earning himself the nickname "fire guy". When Meredith angrily declares she is fine during her intervention, Michael refers to two entertainers when he responds, "Was John Belushi fine? Was Bob Hope fine?" While Michael is bartending during the party, he makes Jim a drink containing orange juice and vodka. Though commonly known as a Screwdriver, Michael ignorantly refers to it as an "Orange-Vod-Juice-Ka", implying that he was the first person to concoct it.

Reception

Phyllis's takeover of the Party Planning Committee and the subsequent fight with Angela ranked number 9 in phillyBurbs.com's top ten moments from the fifth season of The Office.

Brian Howard of The Journal News was mixed in his review of "Moroccan Christmas". He praised the cold open scene, Toby's reaction to the doll and Andy's reaction at the end of the episode. But Howard said he did not enjoy the Moroccan Christmas party theme, and felt scenes of Meredith's alcoholism and Michael dragging her to rehab were more awkward than funny. "Moroccan Christmas" received generally mixed reviews. Alan Sepinwall, television columnist with The Star-Ledger, was highly complimentary toward "Moroccan Christmas", which he said featured "consistent hilarity mixed in with some of the sharpest emotion we've ever gotten from a non Jim & Pam story". Sepinwall called it a strong episode for the Dwight, Andy, Meredith, and Phyllis characters, and particularly complimented the acting of Phyllis Smith. TV Guide writer Shahzad Abbas called it an "excellent episode all around", referring to intervention scene and the fighting among Phyllis and Angela as "really intense stuff". Abbas said he looked forward to seeing the new developments unfold, and said Ed Helms had "never been better with his 'where's these people's Christmas spirit' reaction".

New York magazine writer Will Leitch criticized the episode, claiming the main story between Meredith and Michael seemed forced and did not work. Leitch particularly disliked the Phyllis subplot, claiming her negative behavior toward Angela was out of character and ineffective.

References

External links
"Moroccan Christmas" at NBC.com

The Office (American season 5) episodes
2008 American television episodes
American Christmas television episodes
Television episodes directed by Paul Feig